Rajkumar (  "Prince") is a Bengali romantic action film which was released in 2008, directed by Swapan Saha, the movie featured Prosenjit and Anu Chowdhury.

The movie was a remake of the 
2005 Malayalam movie Rajamanikyam.

Plot
This film about a young boy Raja whom his mother refuses to recognize when she remarries and he goes on to become "Rajkumar", a "khatal owner" is quite an eventful journey. After growing up Rajkumar returns to S. K. Roy's house (person whom his mother had remarried) to set things straight as he has the power attorney of his father's will. His stepbrother Rudra (Abhishek Chatterjee) and own sister conspire against him and become his greatest enemies as they want him out of the way, but a few events bring them together and they finish Vishal (Kaushik Banerjee) a partner in crime of Rudra. Rajkumar accepts his mother back in his life, something which he had been refusing for so long.

Cast
 Prosenjit Chatterjee as Raja/ Rajkumar
 Anu Chowdhury as Deepa
 Abhishek Chatterjee as Rudra Roy
 Kaushik Banerjee as Vishal
 Bodhisattwa Majumdar as Suryakanta Roy/ S.K Roy
 Laboni Sarkar as Mamata Roy
 Swarna Kamal Dutta
 Shyamal Dutta as Bhuvan Kaka
 Sumit Ganguly
 Mrityun Hazra as OC Deben Sarkar

References

External links
www.telegraphindia.com preview

2008 films
Bengali-language Indian films
2000s Bengali-language films
Bengali remakes of Malayalam films